Minnesota State Highway 12 may refer to:
U.S. Route 12 in Minnesota
Minnesota State Highway 12 (1920), a trunk highway in Minnesota